Oskar Keymer (born 2003) is a German actor. In 2015 he starred in the film ”Help, I Shrunk my teacher!”.  He also starred in the movies “Connie & co” (2016) and “Connie & co 2” (2017). Most recently, he starred in the film “Help, I Shrunk my parents!” (2018)

Life
Oskar Keymer was born in 2003 and lives with his family in Cologne.

Filmography

 2012: Hotel 13 (TV series)
 2012: Westen
 2013: Verbotene Liebe (TV series)
 2013: Knallerfrauen (TV series)
 2013: Without Sunlight (short movie)
 2015: 
 2016: Conni & Co
 2017: Conni & Co 2 – Das Geheimnis des T-Rex
2018: Hilfe, ich habe meine Eltern geschrumpft!

References

External links
 
 @ filmportal.de

German male film actors
2003 births
Living people